Manbahadur Tamang (1958 – 24 February 2001) was a Nepalese taekwondo practitioner. He competed in the men's featherweight at the 1988 Summer Olympics. He was murdered by Maoists in 2001.

References

External links
 

1958 births
2001 deaths
Nepalese male taekwondo practitioners
Taekwondo practitioners at the 1988 Summer Olympics
2001 murders in Asia
Male murder victims
Nepalese murder victims
Olympic taekwondo practitioners of Nepal